The India women's cricket team played the West Indies women's cricket team in November 2019. The tour consisted of three Women's One Day Internationals (WODIs), which formed part of the 2017–20 ICC Women's Championship, and five Women's Twenty20 International (WT20I) matches. India won the WODI series 2–1. In the WT20I series, India won the first three matches, to take an unassailable lead. India then went on to win the remaining two fixtures, to sweep the series 5–0.

Squads

Chinelle Henry was ruled out of the second and third WODIs, due to a concussion, and was replaced by Hayley Matthews in the West Indies squad. Matthews was eligible to play for the West Indies, after serving an eight-match suspension. Ahead of the second WODI match, Caneisha Isaac was added to the West Indies squad, replacing Britney Cooper, after Cooper suffered a bruised shin. Stafanie Taylor was initially named as the captain of the West Indies' WT20I squad. However, she suffered a ligament sprain and was ruled out of the series, with Cherry-Ann Fraser added to the squad. Anisa Mohammed replaced Taylor as captain for the WT20I matches.

WODI series

1st WODI

2nd WODI

3rd WODI

WT20I series

1st WT20I

2nd WT20I

3rd WT20I

4th WT20I

5th WT20I

Notes

References

External links
 Series home at ESPN Cricinfo

2019 in women's cricket
2017–20 ICC Women's Championship
2019 in West Indian cricket
2019 in Indian cricket
International cricket competitions in 2019–20
West Indies 2019-20
India  2019-20